Chinakakani is a village in Guntur district of the Indian state of Andhra Pradesh. It is located in Mangalagiri mandal part of Mangalagiri Tadepalle Municipal Corporation part of Guntur revenue division.

Geography 

Demographics 

 census, Chinakakani had a population of 7,040. The total population constitutes 3,561 males and 3,479 females —a sex ratio of 977 females per 1000 males. 748 children are in the age group of 0–6 years, of which 389 are boys and 359 are girls —a ratio of 923 per 1000. The average literacy rate stands at 69.68% with 4,384 literates.

Governance 

Chinakakani gram panchayat is the local self-government of the village. It is divided into wards and each ward is represented by a ward member. The village forms a part of Andhra Pradesh Capital Region and is under the jurisdiction of APCRDA.

Education 

As per the school information report for the academic year 2018–19, the village has a total of 5 schools. These include 3 Zilla Parishad/MPP and 2 private schools.

Transport 

The National Highway 16 passes through the village, which connects Chennai and Kolkata. APS RTC operates bus services from Vijayawada, Guntur and Mangalagiri to this village.

See also 
 List of villages in Guntur district

References 

Villages in Guntur district